Teluk is a village in the Batang Hari Regency in the Jambi Province of Sumatra, Indonesia.

References

External links
Satellite map at Maplandia.com

Populated places in Jambi